Caobilla is a common name for several trees native to the American tropics and may refer to:

Carapa guianensis
Swietenia humilis